Elliot Goldenthal's score for the film was nominated for the Academy Award for Best Original Dramatic Score.

Sinéad O'Connor and Irish tenor Frank Patterson both contributed to the soundtrack.

Track listing 
 "Easter Rebellion" (3:15) - Perf. by Sinéad O'Connor
 "Fire and Arms" (1:40)
 "Train Station Farewell" (1:55)
 "Winter Raid" (2:37)
 "Elegy for a Sunday" (3:07)
 "Football Match" (1:49)
 "On Cats Feet" (4:27)
 "Defiance and Arrest" (1:49)
 "Train to Granard" (1:30)
 "Boland Returns (Kitty's Waltz)" (1:18)
 "His Majesty's Finest" (2:11)
 "Boland's Death" (1:38)
 "Home to Cork" (1:19)
 "Civil War" (2:10) - Perf. by Sinéad O'Connor
 "Collins' Proposal" (1:25)
 "An Anthem Deferred" (1:44)
 "She Moved Through the Fair" (4:55) - Perf. by Sinéad O'Connor
 "Funeral/Coda" (4:32)
 "Macushla" (3'29) - Perf. by Frank Patterson

Crew/Credit 
 Music Composed by Elliot Goldenthal (except 1,14,17 & 19)
 Music Produced by Matthias Gohl
 Orchestrated by Robert Elhai and Elliot Goldenthal
 Conducted by Jonathan Sheffer
 Recorded and Mixed by Joel Iwataki and Steve McLaughlin
 Electronic Music Produced by Richard Martinez
 Choir Conducted by Rick Cordova

References 

Elliot Goldenthal soundtracks
1996 soundtrack albums
Drama film soundtracks
Biographical film soundtracks